The history of trial by jury in England is influential because many English and later British colonies adopted the English common law system in which trial by jury plays an important part.

History
A precursor to the jury trial was the Lafif in the Maliki School of classical Islamic law and jurisprudence, which was developed between the VIII and XI centuries in the medieval Islamic world, specifically in North Africa, Islamic Spain and Emirate of Sicily, and shares a number of similarities with the later jury trials in English common law. Like the English jury, the Islamic Lafif was a body of twelve members drawn from the neighbourhood and sworn to tell the truth, who were bound to give a unanimous verdict, about matters "which they had personally seen or heard, binding on the judge, to settle the truth concerning facts in a case, between ordinary people, and obtained as of right by the plaintiff". A characteristic of the English jury which the Islamic Lafif lacked was the "judicial writ directing the jury to be summoned and directing the bailiff to hear its recognition." According to Professor John Makdisi, author of : ‘’An Inquiry into Islamic Influences During the Formative Period of the Common Law, in Islamic Law and Jurisprudence 135 (N. Heer ed., 1990, University of Washington Press), "no other institution in any legal institution studied to date shares all of these characteristics with the English jury".

It is possible that the concept of the Lafif may have been introduced to England after the Norman conquest of England by the Normans, who conquered and inherited the Islamic legal administration of the Emirate of Sicily (see Arab-Norman culture), and through the close connection between the Norman kingdoms of Roger II in Sicily – ruling over a conquered Islamic administration- and Henry II in England.

According John A. Makdisi, many concepts of English common law, including JURIES, derive from Islamic law. In the same period as William the Conqueror conquered England; Norman adventurers led by Robert Guiscard had taken Sicily, previously under the Arab Fatimid Caliphate. Thus, according to John A. Makdisi, English law became influenced by the Islamic law used in Sicily under the Fatimids rule, including the use of the twelve man jury. John A. Makdisi points to Henry II's laws as having been influenced through people such as Thomas Brown, a member of Henry's government who had previously served in the Sicilian government.

Mostafa Atamnia

May 12th,2021

Anglo-Saxon England

According to George Macaulay Trevelyan in A Shortened History of England (1958), during the Viking occupation:

The English king Æthelred the Unready issued a legal code at Wantage, which states that the twelve leading thegns (minor nobles) of each wapentake (a small district) were required to swear that they would investigate crimes without bias. These 'juries' differed from the present-day kind by being self-informing; instead of getting information through a trial, the jurors were required to investigate the case themselves.

Later Middle Ages
In the 12th century, Henry II took a major step in developing the jury system. Henry set up a system to resolve land disputes using juries. A jury of twelve free men were assigned to arbitrate in these disputes.  Unlike the modern jury, these men were charged with uncovering the facts of the case on their own rather than listening to arguments in court. Henry also introduced what is now known as the "grand jury", through his Grand Assize. Under the assize, a jury of free men was charged with reporting any crimes that they knew of in their hundred to a "justice in eyre", a judge who moved between hundreds on a circuit. A criminal accused by this jury was given a trial by ordeal. Under the jury, the chances of being found guilty were much lower, as the king did not choose verdict (or punishment).

The Church banned participation of clergy in trial by ordeal in 1215. Without the legitimacy of religion, trial by ordeal collapsed. The juries under the assizes began deciding guilt as well as providing accusations. The same year, trial by jury became a fairly explicit right in one of the most influential clauses of Magna Carta, signed by King John. Article 39 of Magna Carta reads (translated by Lysander Spooner in his Essay on the Trial by Jury (1852)):

Although the charter says "or by the law of the land", this in no manner can be interpreted as if it were enough to have a positive law, made by the king, to be able to proceed legally against a subject. The law of the land was the consuetudinary law, based on the customs and consent of King John's subjects and, since there was no Parliament in those times, neither the king nor the barons could make a law without the consent of the people. According to some sources, in the time of Edward III, "by the law of the land" had been substituted "by due process of law", which in those times was a trial by twelve peers.

During the mid-14th century, it was forbidden that persons who had sat on the presenting jury (i.e., in modern parlance, the grand jury) should also sit on the trial jury for that crime. Medieval juries were self-informing, in that individuals were chosen as jurors because they either knew the parties and the facts, or they had the duty to discover them. This spared the government the cost of fact-finding. Over time, English juries became less self-informing and relied more on the trial itself for information on the case. Jurors remained free to investigate cases on their own until the 17th century. Magna Carta being forgotten after a succession of benevolent reigns (or, more probably, reigns limited by the jury and the barons, and only under the rule of laws that the juries and barons found acceptable), the kings, through the royal judges, began to extend their control over the jury and the kingdom.

David Hume in his 1778 History of England tells something of the powers that the kings had accumulated in the times after Magna Carta, the prerogatives of the crown and the sources of great power with which these monarchs counted:

Early modern period
The first paragraph of the Act that abolished the Star Chamber, long a bone of contention between the early Stuart kings and a significant fraction of their subjects, on 5 July 1641 repeats the clause on the right of a citizen to be judged by his peers:

Many English colonies, including the Thirteen Colonies, which later became the United States, adopted the jury trial system.

In 1670 two Quakers charged with unlawful assembly, William Penn and William Mead, were found not guilty at the Central Criminal Court at the Old Bailey by a jury. The judge then imprisoned the jury without food, water, heat, or light, saying "I will have a positive verdict or you'll starve for it". They refused to give way, and the judge fined them and returned them to prison, until released when the Lord Chief Justice interceded, saying that a judge "may try to open the eyes of jurors, but not to lead them by the nose". Penn and Meade remained in prison; despite the verdict of not guilty of the original charges, they had not removed their hats in court. Edward Bushel, a member of the jury, took out a writ to free Penn and Meade. The trial is referred to as Bushel's Case, and is a landmark case that established beyond question the independence of the jury in the English legal system. There is a plaque on the wall of the Old Bailey to this effect, praising the courage and endurance of Bushel and the other jurymen.

Women on the jury
Women first served on juries in England in 1920.

See also 
 Juries in England and Wales

References

Further reading
 
 

Legal history of England
Juries in the United Kingdom